A Matryoshka doll is a set of dolls of decreasing sizes placed one inside the other.

Matryoshka may also refer to:

Arts, entertainment and media
 Matroesjka's, a Belgian television series
 Matryoshka (album), an album by Belarusian rock group Lyapis Trubetskoy
 Matryoshka (play), a Persian-language satire
 Matryoshka Radio, a Russian-language radio station broadcasting in the United Kingdom 
 "Matryoshka", a song by Nico Touches the Walls from the album Passenger
 Matryoshka Doll, a special grenade featured in the video game Call of Duty: Black Ops

Gemstone 
 Matryoshka (diamond), a unique diamond with another diamond moving freely inside was mined in Yakutia at the Nyurba mining and processing division of Alrosa

Science and technology 
 Matroska, a video container file format, in computing
 Matroshka experiments on the International Space Station, assessing cosmic radiation doses for space travellers
 Matrioshka brain, a hypothetical computer surrounding a star

See also
Russian Dolls (disambiguation)